Eugene Taylor may refer to:

Eugene Hartwell Taylor (1853–1924), of architectural firm Josselyn & Taylor
Eugene Taylor (psychologist) (1946–2013), historian of psychology
Eugene Van Taylor (born 1953), American soccer goalkeeper

See also
Gene Taylor (disambiguation)